The Joe F. Carr Trophy was the first award given in the National Football League (NFL) to recognize a most valuable player for each season. It was first awarded in 1938, known then as the Gruen Trophy, and renamed in 1939 in honor of NFL commissioner Joseph Carr. The Gruen Trophy, sponsored by Gruen Watch Co., was first awarded in 1937 to Dutch Clark of the Detroit Lions. However, both contemporary and modern sources consider the 1938 award the first retroactive Joe F. Carr Trophy, and thus the first NFL MVP award. Players were chosen by a panel of sportswriters who distributed first and second place votes. It was awarded until the 1946 season, and it remains the only MVP award the NFL has officially sanctioned.

See also
 National Football League Most Valuable Player Award for an overview of NFL MVP awards, both past and present
 List of National Football League awards

References
General
 

Footnotes

National Football League trophies and awards
Most valuable player awards